Rahim Alihuseyn oghlu Huseynov (born 5 April 1936), was the 3rd Prime Minister of Azerbaijan.

Early life
Huseynov was born in Baku, Azerbaijan. He graduating from school, Huseynov studied at Moscow Institute of Steel and Alloys from 1953 through 1959 obtaining a degree in Metallurgy Engineering. In 1959-1962 he worked in various positions at Azerbaijan Pipe Manufacturing Factory. From 1962 until 1965, Huseynov served as Head of Department at Azerbaijan SSR State Planning Committee. In 1965-1965, he served as Deputy Manager of Financial Technical Supplies Committee and as the chairman of the same government office. In 1990's, Huseynov was a co-founder and is still the chairman of Azerbaijani Scientists and Engineers Union.

Political career
Huseynov was the Chairman of the Azerbaijan State Planning Committee and Deputy Chairman of Cabinet of Ministers of Azerbaijan from 1989 through 1992. In May 1992, Huseynov was appointed the Prime Minister of Azerbaijan and served until January 1993, when he resigned from the post at his own will. During his term in office, GNP fell by 20%.

Awards
Huseynov has been awarded with Order of Friendship of Peoples, Order of the Red Banner of Labour and the Honor Order throughout his career.

References 

Prime Ministers of Azerbaijan
Politicians from Baku
Government ministers of Azerbaijan
1936 births
Living people
Azerbaijan Communist Party (1920) politicians
20th-century Azerbaijani economists
National University of Science and Technology MISiS alumni